Escort may refer to:

Protection
Bodyguard, a security operative who accompanies clients for their personal protection
Police escort, a feature offered by law enforcement agencies to assist in transporting individuals
Safety escort service, a service provided on and around many college and university campuses to help ensure the safety of students and staff
Escort carrier, a small aircraft carrier used in World War II
Escort destroyer, a warship assigned to protect merchant ships in time of war
Escort fighter, a World War II concept for a fighter aircraft designed to escort bombers
Escort vehicle, a vehicle that escorts oversize trucks or large vehicle convoys on highways

Arts and media

Film
The Escort (1993 film), an Italian film directed by Ricky Tognazzi
The Escort (1996 film), a Canadian film directed by Denis Langlois
The Escort (1997 film), an American film directed by Gary Graver
Escort (2001 film), a Chinese film directed by Qi Xing
Escort (2006 film), a Dutch film directed by Frank Ketelaar
The Escort (2015 film), an American film directed by Will Slocombe

Music
Escort (band), an American nu-disco band
The Escorts (American band), a 1950s/1960s rock and roll band from Iowa
The Escorts (British band), a Merseybeat group
The Escorts (American R&B group), a soul/R&B group formed in Rahway State Prison, New Jersey
Escort (album), by Escort, 2011
"Escort", a song by the Sea and Cake from The Biz, 1995

Theatre
 Escort (play), a 1942 play by the British writer Patrick Hastings

Publishing
Escort (magazine), a British men's adult magazine

Processions
A type of procession, an organized body of people advancing in a formal or ceremonial manner:
Cavalcade, a procession on horseback, or a mass trail ride by a company of riders
Motorcade, a procession of vehicles

Prostitution
 Escort (call girl or male prostitute), a sex worker who advertises their work/services inconspicuously
 Escort agency, a company that provides customers with sexual/romantic companions

Other uses
Ford Escort (disambiguation)
Escort destroyer (disambiguation)
Escorts Group, an Indian engineering conglomerate manufacturing tractors and auto components

See also
Convoy, a group of vehicles or ships traveling together for mutual support